Sarcohyla pentheter, the mourning treefrog, is a species of frog in the family Hylidae.
It is endemic to Mexico. Its natural habitats are subtropical or tropical moist montane forests and rivers. It is threatened by habitat loss.

References

pentheter
Amphibians described in 1965
Taxonomy articles created by Polbot